Number 17 may refer to:

 17 (number)
 Number 17 (play), a 1925 play by Joseph Jefferson Farjeon 
 Number 17 (novel), a 1926 novel by Farjeon, inspired by the play
 Number 17 (1920 film), a silent American film directed by George Beranger
 Number 17 (1928 film), a silent British-German film directed by  Géza von Bolváry
 Number Seventeen, a 1932 British film directed by Alfred Hitchcock
 Number 17 (1949 film), a Swedish film directed by Gösta Stevens